Ulrychów is a metro station on the western part of Line M2 of the Warsaw Metro. It is located by Górczewska Street, in the vicinity of the Wola Park shopping mall in Wola district.

Description

The construction of the station began in 2019. It was previously named in design documents as Wola Park.

The station opened for passenger service on 30 June 2022. The station was designed by a consortium of the Metroprojekt and the AMC Andrzej M. Chołdzyński architectural firms. Like the neighbouring station to its west, Bemowo station, Ulrychów station keeps a brick and green-colour colour theme. The interior walls of the metro station are made out of patinated copper.

The station platform is 160 m in length, and has a cubic capacity of 60 272 m³.

References

External links

ZTM Municipal Transport Authority website - Warsaw Metro page

Railway stations in Poland opened in 2022
Line 2 (Warsaw Metro) stations